The War Machines is the tenth and final serial of the third season of the British science fiction television series Doctor Who, which was first broadcast in 4 weekly parts from 25 June to 16 July 1966.

The serial is set in 1960s London, shortly after construction of the Post Office Tower was completed. In the serial, the time traveller the First Doctor (William Hartnell) and sailor Ben Jackson (Michael Craze) work together to stop the self-thinking computer WOTAN (voiced by Gerald Taylor) from invading London with the deadly War Machines controlled by WOTAN.

This serial marks the departure of Jackie Lane as Dodo Chaplet and also the first appearance of Michael Craze and Anneke Wills as new companions Ben and Polly. It is also the only known complete serial to feature Anneke Wills and Michael Craze, and the final complete serial from the William Hartnell era.

Plot
The TARDIS lands in London, near the Post Office Tower, where the First Doctor and Dodo meet Professor Brett, the creator of WOTAN (short for Will Operating Thought ANalogue). In four days' time, WOTAN will be linked to other major computers across the world to take them over, including those of the White House, Cape Kennedy and the Royal Navy.

Dodo goes with Polly, Brett's secretary, to the Inferno nightclub, where they meet Ben Jackson, while the Doctor attends a Royal Scientific Club meeting about WOTAN, led by Sir Charles Summer. Before Brett can depart for the meeting, he is hypnotised by WOTAN. He then fetches Krimpton, an electronics colleague, and takes him to WOTAN, where he, too, is possessed by the computer. Major Green, the chief of security in the Tower, is also taken over, and sends WOTAN's control signals to Dodo at the nightclub via telephone.

Using its hypnotic control, WOTAN enlists a workforce to construct twelve robotic War Machines around London. One of these machines is built in a warehouse in Covent Garden, close to the Inferno nightclub.

The next day, the Doctor telephones Brett at the Post Office Tower, and is nearly possessed by WOTAN. Thinking the Doctor is now controlled, Dodo reveals that the War Machines are being constructed in strategic points in London. The Doctor breaks WOTAN's hypnotic control over her, and she is sent to stay with Sir Charles's wife in the country to recover.

The Doctor sends Ben to investigate the area around the nightclub, where he discovers a War Machine, now fully assembled. Ben is detected by the Machine, and caught by the now hypnotised Polly. Ben learns that the War Machines are to attack at noon the next day. He escapes and alerts the Doctor and Sir Charles. Polly is sent back to the Tower to be punished by WOTAN.

Under Sir Charles's instruction, an army taskforce investigates the warehouse. They are forced to retreat, but when the Doctor stands before the Machine, it stops—it had not been completely programmed. Soon after, there are reports of another War Machine—Machine 9—taking to the streets. The Doctor traps the Machine in an electromagnetic forcefield and reprogrammes it to destroy WOTAN. Ben goes to the Post Office Tower and drags Polly out of the WOTAN room as the Machine enters and attacks the immobile computer. Krimpton is killed, but WOTAN is destroyed before it can give the order for the other ten War Machines to commence their attack. Brett and all the others who have been hypnotised return to normal.

Ben and Polly meet the Doctor at the TARDIS, to explain that Dodo has decided to stay in London. The Doctor thanks them and heads into the police box—followed by Ben and Polly. They are then suddenly whisked off into time and space.

Production
Working titles for this story included The Computers. The idea for this story came about when Kit Pedler was being interviewed for a position as science adviser to the series. The producers asked all of the interviewees what would happen if the recently built Post Office Tower somehow took over. Pedler suggested that it would be the work of a rogue computer that communicated with the outside world by means of the telephone system. The producers liked this suggestion and not only offered Pedler the job but developed the idea into a script (one of the few to feature a 'Story Idea by' credit). Pat Dunlop was then hired to write a full set of teleplays from Pedler's idea, but quit after becoming busy with other work, and the teleplays were subsequently done by Ian Stuart Black, who had also written the previous serial, The Savages.

Only one War Machine prop was actually constructed; the production team changed the numbers, to represent the different machines.

The titling style of each episode in this serial differs from the standard titles of other serials. Instead of a title overlay, after the "Doctor Who" logo has faded, the screen shifts to a solid background containing four inversely coloured rectangles aligned down the left-hand side (reminiscent to an old-style computer punched card). The title, one syllable at a time, scrolls upwards—"THE", "WAR", "MACH", "INES"—with a final flash displaying the complete title on two lines. Another flash reveals the writer, the next flash reveals the word "EPISODE", and the final flash shows the actual episode number. All of the lettering displayed in this titling sequence is shown in a typeface based on the numeric E-13B font that was then in common use for magnetic ink character recognition. Each of the four episodes' title sequences have slight variations to them.

The decision to set more episodes on present-day Earth was taken because the producers felt that the audience was becoming bored with the purely historical episodes that had been a major element of the show to date. As a result, this story marks the beginning of the turn away from historical stories. The next two historical stories, The Smugglers (which immediately follows The War Machines) and Season 4's The Highlanders, were to be the last purely historical stories until Season 19's Black Orchid.

This story is also one of the very rare instances where The Doctor is referred to as "Doctor Who" by a character in the story, aside from when intended to be comical.

Casting
Sandra Bryant appeared in The Macra Terror, as did John Harvey. John Rolfe later played Sam in The Moonbase and Fell in The Green Death. Frank Jarvis later played Ankh in Underworld and Skart in The Power of Kroll.

Michael Craze provided the voice of a policeman heard in Episode four. WOTAN received a credit as "And WOTAN" at the end of the first three episodes, the only time a fictional character was credited as itself in the series. Jackie Lane's contract expired midway through production of this story. She does not appear again after episode two; Dodo's off-screen departure is relayed to the Doctor by Polly.

The BBC newsreader Kenneth Kendall appeared as himself. Similarly the voice of radio announcer Dwight Whylie is also heard. Mike Reid who was later known as a comedian and for his role as Frank Butcher in EastEnders appeared as an extra.

Recovery of the missing episodes
Aside from its soundtrack (recorded off-air by fans), this serial was lost in the junking of episodes in the 1970s. The master videotapes for the story were the last of those starring William Hartnell to be wiped, surviving until March 1974. The 16 mm film telerecording copies held by BBC Enterprises were also the last of their kind to be destroyed, surviving until early 1978, shortly before the junking of material was halted by the intervention of fan Ian Levine. In late 1978, a collector in Australia provided a copy of episode 2. Later in 1984 copies of all four episodes were returned from Nigeria. Episodes 2, 3 and 4 all had cuts to them, but most have been restored due to a combination of the other copy of episode 2, material used in a promotional item on the BBC's Blue Peter and censored clips from Australia. Some of the restored footage did not have its accompanying soundtrack, and so the missing sound was restored from the off-air recordings. The War Machines is currently the last surviving complete serial from the William Hartnell era; the following serial (The Smugglers) is entirely missing, while Hartnell's final serial (The Tenth Planet) is missing episode 4. Currently, this is the only complete serial featuring Michael Craze and Anneke Wills as Ben and Polly that exists in the BBC archives.

To date, only episodes 3 and 4 do not exist in their entirety as was originally intended. Episode 3 is missing a visual brief bit of dialogue with Krimpton talking. This was replaced in the VHS release with a combination of a shot of WOTAN with the accompanied dialogue from the off-air recordings. Episode 3 is also missing around 59 seconds' worth of the battle in the warehouse. This scene, however, has not been re-instated for the VHS release as it was felt that there wouldn't be enough visual material to drop into the gap. Episode 4 is missing only a small amount of material. The first instance occurs with the man in the telephone box. Part of the continuing close-up of the man talking on the telephone is missing, but this was compensated on the VHS release by continuing in audio-only over the top of the beginning of the high shot of the phone box. There are also two lines of dialogue missing when Polly reports back to WOTAN.

The DVD release has all of the episodes recreated and restored to their original length, as well as a 9-minute documentary showing how the episodes were reconstructed from all the disparate sources.

Broadcast and reception

In 2009, Patrick Mulkern of Radio Times praised the contemporary edge taken with The War Machines, though he wrote that the plot was "mechanical" with several improbabilities. DVD Talk's J. Doyle Wallis gave The War Machines three out of five stars, calling it "serviceable" with WOTAN and its henchmen lacking depth. Den of Geek also gave the story three stars, highlighting Hartnell's performance and opining that the story "holds up well", though there were some plot holes. Arnold T Blumburg of IGN rated the story 7 out of 10, noting that the concept had aged but it was entertaining. However, he criticised Dodo's departure and, while the serial did showcase Hartnell well, he sometimes seemed lost in the setting. The A.V. Club reviewer Christopher Bahn, on the other hand, described the plot as "pretty good if not a classic, with an appealing B-movie sensibility—this feels like a better, if equally cheaply made, version of the kind of movie featured on Mystery Science Theater 3000." However, he criticised the abrupt departure of Dodo. Johnathan Wilkins of Dreamwatch gave the serial a score of 9 out of 10, calling it "something of a forgotten masterpiece", mostly due to Hartnell's performance. However, he noted that the War Machines themselves were "too dull" and "boxy". In 2013, Ben Lawrence of The Daily Telegraph named The War Machines as one of the top ten Doctor Who stories set in the contemporary time.

Commercial releases

In print

A novelisation of this serial, written by Ian Stuart Black, was published by Target Books in February 1989.

Home media
The serial was released on VHS in 1997, with an item from Blue Peter and a BBC1 "globe ident" (from the first part of the story) as extras. A Region 2 DVD issue was released on 25 August 2008; the Region 1 DVD was released on 6 January 2009. With the advance in technology since the original VHS release, the sections, which were missing from it, have been reinstated using the audio and appropriate visual material. Also, in 2007, an audio CD of the serial's soundtrack, with linking narration by and bonus interview with Anneke Wills, was released.

References

External links

Doctor Who Locations – The War Machines

Target novelisation

On Target – The War Machines

First Doctor serials
1966 British television episodes
Doctor Who serials novelised by Ian Stuart Black
Doctor Who stories set on Earth
Fiction set in 1966
Rediscovered television